Betty Molteni (born 30 August 1962) is a former Italian female middle-distance runner and cross-country runner who competed at individual senior level at the World Athletics Cross Country Championships (1985, 1986, 1990).

National titles
She won a national championship at individual senior level.
Italian Athletics Championships
1500 m: 1987

References

External links
 

1962 births
Living people
Italian female middle-distance runners
Italian female cross country runners